Christian Schlagle Eyster (May 19, 1814 – November 6, 1886) was an associate justice of the Colorado Territorial Supreme Court from August 11, 1866, to March 2, 1871. He was appointed by President Andrew Johnson in 1866, but because congress was not in session at the time of his appointment, the senate confirmed his appointment and he received his official commission on March 2, 1867.

Eyster was President Johnson's last Colorado judicial appointment. He was a former law partner of Secretary of State William H. Seward.

Early life
Eyster was born in Chambersburg, Pennsylvania on May 19, 1814. He attended Wesleyan University in Connecticut, leaving in 1833. He practiced law in Pittsburgh from 1837 to 1840 and was a member of the Pennsylvania Legislature from 1853 to 1855.

Career in Colorado
After he served on Colorado's Territorial Supreme Court, he practiced law in Colorado from 1871 to 1876. From 1875 to 1877, Eyster served as district attorney for a large part of northeastern Colorado, including Denver (then in Arapahoe County) and Weld County. He then practiced law and was involved in mining operations from 1878 until his death.

Death
Eyster died November 6, 1886, in Fruita, Colorado.

References

Justices of the Colorado Supreme Court
Colorado Territory officials
1814 births
1886 deaths
People from Denver
People from Chambersburg, Pennsylvania
Colorado lawyers
District attorneys in Colorado
Wesleyan University alumni
19th-century American politicians
19th-century American judges
19th-century American lawyers
Republican Party members of the Pennsylvania House of Representatives
Whig Party (United States) politicians